Johan Mattias Rahm (born 12 March 1973) is a Swedish Olympic sailor. He finished 12th in the 470 event at the 2000 Summer Olympics together with Johan Molund.

Sailing Biography: 
1988 12th place optimist worlds
1990 Nordic junior Champion, Europe class
1992  Nordic Champion, Europe class
1994 World Champion, Europe class
1995 World Champion, Europe class
1998 3rd, 470 Worlds 
1999 2nd, 470 Worlds
2005 - 2007 strategist and second helmsman, Victory Challenge, 32nd Americas Cup. 
2008 Winner Match Cup Sweden.
2013 Winner M32 Cup, Scandinavia 
2014 2nd place M32 Series Scandinavia.
2015 2nd place M32 Series Scandinavia

References

Swedish male sailors (sport)
Olympic sailors of Sweden
470 class sailors
Royal Gothenburg Yacht Club sailors
Sailors at the 2000 Summer Olympics – 470
Europe class world champions
World champions in sailing for Sweden
1973 births
Living people